Antoine "Tony" Suleiman Frangieh (1 September 1941 – 13 June 1978) was a Lebanese politician and militia commander during the early years of the Lebanese Civil War. He was the son of Suleiman Frangieh, a former Lebanese president.

Education and early political career
Frangieh was educated at the College Des Frères Tripoli, first in Tripoli then in Beirut, at the latter from 1958 to 1960. He was furthering his studies before his death.

Frangieh began his career dealing with his family business. On 25 October 1970, he succeeded his father, Suleiman Frangieh, as a member of the Lebanese Parliament for Zgharta, following his father's election to the Presidency. He was also appointed the minister of posts and telecommunications in his father's government.

Civil war
At the end of the 1960s, when factions within Lebanon started to form militias, the Frangieh clan formed the Marada Brigade, also known as the Zgharta Liberation Army (ZLA), under the command of Tony Frangieh. The Marada/ZLA mainly operated out of Tripoli and northern Lebanon, the base of the Frangieh family.

The Lebanese Civil War witnessed many shifting alliances where the allies of today became the enemies of tomorrow. One such falling out occurred between two of the leading Maronite clans, the Frangiehs and the Gemayels. The Frangiehs, who were close to Syria, were critical of Phalangist Kataeb Regulatory Forces' militia leader Bachir Gemayel's growing alliance with Israel. Militiamen from the Phalange RF and Marada also clashed over protection rackets.

This conflict led to the murder of Tony Frangieh, his wife, Vera (née el Kordahi), and his three-year-old daughter Jihane by Phalangist militiamen, known as the Ehden massacre. His son, Suleiman, was in Beirut during the murder.

Under cover of darkness on 13 June 1978, a combined force of 1,200 Phalangists led by Elie Hobeika and Samir Geagea, attacked and killed Tony Frangieh and his immediate family, thereby eliminating one of the protagonists vying for political power in the Christian Lebanese community.

Suleiman Frangieh never vowed revenge. As he stated in a documentary on a Lebanese political channel called 'OTV', "That was the past and it must be forgotten, I do not seek revenge because God is the only judge, thus their conscience will haunt them for the rest of their lives."

Many commentators consider the murder of Tony Frangieh to be one of the factors in the longevity of the Lebanese Civil War and as the starting point of a deep divide between Lebanese Christians. Some 20,000 mourners attended his funeral, including then Lebanese Prime Minister Salim Hoss on 14 June 1978.

Personal life
Frangieh had two children, Suleiman Frangieh Jr. and Jihane, with Vera Frangieh, whom he married in 1962. His son Suleiman first became the Minister of Public Health at the age of 22, and he served as the Ministry of Interior from 2004 to 2005. He is known to have served with the Marada Brigade in the 1980s.

See also
List of assassinated Lebanese politicians
List of attacks in Lebanon

References

Further reading
 Claire Hoy and Victor Ostrovsky, By Way of Deception: The Making and Unmaking of a Mossad Officer, St. Martin's Press, New York 1990. 
 Denise Ammoun, Histoire du Liban contemporain: Tome 2 1943-1990, Fayard, Paris 2005.  (in French) – 
 Fawwaz Traboulsi, A History of Modern Lebanon: Second Edition, Pluto Press, London 2012. 
 Robert Fisk, Pity the Nation: Lebanon at War, London: Oxford University Press, (3rd ed. 2001).  
 Jean Sarkis, Histoire de la guerre du Liban, Presses Universitaires de France - PUF, Paris 1993.  (in French)
 Samuel M. Katz, Lee E. Russel, and Ron Volstad, Armies in Lebanon 1982-84, Men-at-Arms series 165, Osprey Publishing, London 1985.  
 Samir Kassir, La Guerre du Liban: De la dissension nationale au conflit régional, Éditions Karthala/CERMOC, Paris 1994.  (in French)
 Matthew S. Gordon, The Gemayels (World Leaders Past & Present), Chelsea House Publishers, 1988.

External links
Al-Marada official site (in Arabic)
Chamussy (René) – Chronique d’une guerre: Le Liban 1975-1977 – éd. Desclée – 1978 (in French)
Tony Frangieh on Ehden Family Tree Website

1941 births
1978 deaths
Assassinated Lebanese politicians
Lebanese Maronites
Warlords
People murdered in Lebanon
Members of the Parliament of Lebanon
Postal services ministers of Lebanon
Government ministers of Lebanon
Marada Movement politicians
Tony
People of the Lebanese Civil War
Children of national leaders
People from Zgharta
Children of national leaders of Lebanon